Wen of Han may refer to:

Marquess Wen of Han (died 377 BC)
Emperor Wen of Han (203–157 BC)